Repatriation of Poles can refer to:
Repatriation of Poles (1944–1946)
Repatriation of Poles (1955–1959)

See also
Expulsion of Poles (disambiguation)